Crow is an unincorporated community in Raleigh County, West Virginia, United States.

The community was named after the black crow native to the area.

References

Unincorporated communities in Raleigh County, West Virginia
Unincorporated communities in West Virginia